Henrik Djernis (born 22 April 1968) is a Danish cyclist. He competed in cyclo-cross, mountain bike and road racing. He was the first man to win the World Mountain Bike Championship three times, which he did in 1992 (in Bromont, QC, Canada), 1993 (in Métabief, France), and 1994 (in Vail, CO, United States). Djernis won the Danish Cyclocross National Championship ten times in a row from 1989 to 1998 and then won the title twice more in 2000 and 2001.

He has been nominated for induction into the Mountain Bike Hall of Fame by Tom Ritchey.

Major results

Cyclo-cross

1983
 1st  National Junior Championships
1984
 1st  National Junior Championships
1985
 1st  National Championships
1986
 1st  National Championships
1987
 1st  National Championships
1988
 1st  National Championships
 3rd  UCI Amateur World Championships
1989
 1st  National Championships
1990
 1st  National Championships
1991
 1st  National Championships
 2nd  UCI Amateur World Championships
1992
 1st  National Championships
1993
 1st  National Championships
 1st  UCI Amateur World Championships
1994
 1st  National Championships
1995
 1st  National Championships
1996
 1st  National Championships
1997
 1st  National Championships
1998
 1st  National Championships
 3rd  UCI World Championships
2000
 1st  National Championships
2001
 1st  National Championships

Mountain bike

1992
 1st  UCI World XCO Championships
1993
 1st  UCI World XCO Championships
 1st  National XCO Championships
1994
 1st  UCI World XCO Championships
 1st  National XCO Championships
1997
 1st  National XCO Championships
 2nd  UCI World XCO Championships
1998
 1st  National XCO Championships
1999
 1st  National XCO Championships
2000
 1st  National XCO Championships

Sources
 Ritchey, Tom 1999  Biography of Henrik Djernis for his nomination to the Mountain Bike Hall of Fame

External links
His nomination page on the Mountain Bike Hall of Fame.

1968 births
Living people
Danish male cyclists
Cross-country mountain bikers
Cyclo-cross cyclists
People from Kalundborg Municipality
UCI Mountain Bike World Champions (men)
Sportspeople from Region Zealand